Ludwig Eichrodt (February 2, 1827, Durlach bei Karlsruhe – February 2, 1892, Lahr) was a German poet and dramatist.

Biography
Ludwig Eichrodt was the son of Ludwig Friedrich Eichrodt (1798-1844), an officer, and Elisabeth (née Joos, 1809-1891) Eichrodt.  He studied at Heidelberg and Freiburg and published in 1848 in Fliegende Blätter his comic songs, “Wanderlust,” which had great popularity.

Literary works 
 Gedichte in allerlei Humoren (Stuttgart 1853)
 Schneiderbüchlein (anonymous with H. Goll, Stuttgart 1853)
 Leben und Liebe, poems (Frankfurt 1856)
 Die Pfalzgrafen, dramatic poem (Lahr 1859)
 Deutsches Knabenbuch; Weltruhm in Reimsprüchen (Lahr 1865)
 Alboin, dramatic poem (Bühl 1865)
 Rhein-schwäbisch, poem in middle-Baden dialect (Karlsruhe 1869, 2. Aufl. 1873)
 Lyrischer Kehraus (Straßburg 1869, 2 Teile)
 Lyrische Karikaturen, anthology (Straßburg 1869)
 Biedermeiers Liederlust (Straßburg 1870)
 Melodien, songs (Stuttgart 1875)
 Hortus dellclarum, humorous anthology (Lahr 1876-80, 6 Teile)
 Gold. Sammlung des Ursprünglichen und Genialen in deutscher Lyrik (Leipzig 1882)
His collected works were published in 1890 at Stuttgart.

Notes

References

External links 
 Karlsruhe:Ludwig Eichrodt
 Bücher von und über Ludwig Eichrodt bei der Staatsbibliothek zu Berlin
 Ludwig Eichrodt (all poems)

1827 births
1892 deaths
19th-century German poets
People from the Grand Duchy of Baden
German male poets
German male dramatists and playwrights
19th-century German dramatists and playwrights
19th-century German male writers